Magomed-Emi Said-Emiyevich Dzhabrailov (born 24 March 1993) is a Russian football player. He also holds French citizenship and was registered to play in Russian leagues as a foreign player.

Club career
Dzhabrailov made his debut in the Russian Football National League for FC Fakel Voronezh on 3 March 2019 in a game against FC Khimki, as an 87th minute substitute for Ivan Oleynikov.

In October 2020, Dzhabrailov signed for Kazakhstan Premier League club FC Okzhetpes.

References

External links
 
 Profile by Russian Football National League
 

1993 births
Living people
French footballers
Russian footballers
Russian expatriate footballers
Association football midfielders
Sportspeople from Ryazan Oblast
People from Pronsky District
Marbella FC players
FC Stumbras players
FC Akhmat Grozny players
SK Austria Klagenfurt players
FK Jonava players
FC Fakel Voronezh players
FC Okzhetpes players
Tercera División players
A Lyga players
Austrian Regionalliga players
Kazakhstan Premier League players
Russian expatriate sportspeople in Spain
Russian expatriate sportspeople in Lithuania
Russian expatriate sportspeople in Austria
Russian expatriate sportspeople in Kazakhstan
Expatriate footballers in Spain
Expatriate footballers in Lithuania
Expatriate footballers in Austria
Expatriate footballers in Kazakhstan